Dmitri Victorovich Anosov (November 30, 1936 – August 7, 2014) was a Russian mathematician active during the Soviet Union, he is best known for his contributions to dynamical systems theory.

He was a full member of the Russian Academy of Sciences and a laureate of the USSR State Prize (1976). He was a student of Lev Pontryagin. In 2014, he died at the age of 77.

See also
Anosov diffeomorphism
Anosov map
Pseudo-Anosov map

References

External links
 Author profile in the database zbMATH

1936 births
2014 deaths
20th-century Russian mathematicians
21st-century Russian mathematicians
Soviet mathematicians
Anosov, Dmitri Victorovich
Recipients of the USSR State Prize
Dynamical systems theorists
Burials in Troyekurovskoye Cemetery
Academic staff of Moscow State University